Buprenorphine is an opioid used to treat opioid use disorder, acute pain, and chronic pain. It can be used under the tongue (sublingual), in the cheek (buccal), by injection (intravenous and subcutaneous), as a skin patch (transdermal), or as an implant. For opioid use disorder, it is typically started when withdrawal symptoms have begun and for the first two days of treatment under direct observation of a health-care provider. In the United States, the combination formulation of buprenorphine/naloxone (Suboxone) is usually prescribed to discourage misuse by injection. Maximum pain relief is generally within an hour with effects up to 24 hours. Buprenorphine affects different types of opioid receptors in different ways. Depending on the type of receptor, it may be an agonist, partial agonist, or antagonist.  In the treatment of opioid use disorder buprenorphine is an agonist/antagonist, meaning that it relieves withdrawal symptoms from other opioids and induces some euphoria, but also blocks the ability for many other opioids, including heroin, to cause an effect.  Unlike full agonists like heroin or methadone, buprenorphine has a ceiling effect, such that taking more medicine will not increase the effects of the drug.

Side effects may include respiratory depression (decreased breathing), sleepiness, adrenal insufficiency, QT prolongation, low blood pressure, allergic reactions, constipation, and opioid addiction. Among those with a history of seizures,  a risk exists of further seizures. Opioid withdrawal following stopping buprenorphine is generally less severe than with other opioids. Whether use during pregnancy is safe is unclear, but use while breastfeeding is probably safe, since the dose the infant receives is 1-2% that of the maternal dose, on a weight basis.

Buprenorphine was patented in 1965, and approved for medical use in the United States in 1981. It is on the World Health Organization's List of Essential Medicines. In addition to prescription as an analgesic it is  a common medication used to treat opioid use disorders, such as addiction to heroin. In 2020, it was the 186th most commonly prescribed medication in the United States, with more than 2.8million prescriptions. Buprenorphine may also be used recreationally for the high it produces, and in the US sublingual formulations are marketed as a film or mixed with naloxone to discourage injection. In the United States, buprenorphine is a schedule III controlled substance.

Medical uses

Opioid use disorder

Buprenorphine is used to treat people with opioid use disorder. In the U.S., the combination formulation of buprenorphine/naloxone is generally prescribed to deter injection, since naloxone, an opioid antagonist, causes acute withdrawal if the formulation is crushed and injected. However, taken orally, the nalaxone has virtually no effect, due to the drug's extremely high first-pass metabolism and low bioavailability (2%). Before starting buprenorphine, individuals are generally advised to wait long enough after their last dose of opioid until they have some withdrawal symptoms to allow for the medication to bind the receptors, since if taken too soon, buprenorphine can displace other opioids bound to the receptors and precipitate an acute withdrawal. The dose of buprenorphine is then adjusted until symptoms improve, and individuals remain on a maintenance dose of 8–16 mg.  Because withdrawal is uncomfortable and a deterrent for many patients, many have begun to call for different means of treatment initiation.  Some providers have begun to use the Bernese method, also known as microdosing, in which very small doses of buprenorphine are given while patients are still using street opioids, and without precipitating withdrawal, with medicine levels slowly titrated upward.

Buprenorphine versus methadone
Both buprenorphine and methadone are medications used for detoxification and opioid replacement therapy, and appear to have similar effectiveness based on limited data. Both are safe for pregnant women with opioid use disorder, although preliminary evidence suggests that methadone is more likely to cause neonatal abstinence syndrome. In the US and European Union, only designated clinics can prescribe methadone for opioid use disorder, requiring patients to travel to the clinic daily. If patients are drug free for a period they may be permitted to receive "take home doses," reducing their visits to as little as once a week. Alternatively, up to a month's supply of buprenorphine has been able to be prescribed by clinicians in the US or Europe who have completed a basic training (8–24 hours in the US) and received a waiver/licence allowing prescription of the medicine.  In France, buprenorphine prescription for opioid use disorder has been permitted without any special training or restrictions since 1995, resulting in treatment of approximately ten times more patients per year with buprenorphine than with methadone in the following decade. In 2021, seeking to address record levels of opioid overdose, the United States also removed the requirement for a special waiver for prescribing physicians. Whether this change will be sufficient to impact prescription is unclear, since even before the change as many as half of physicians with a waiver permitting them to prescribe buprenorphine did not do so, and one third of non-waivered physicians reported that nothing would induce them to prescribe buprenorphine for opioid use disorder.

Chronic pain
A transdermal patch is available for the treatment of chronic pain. These patches are not indicated for use in acute pain, pain that is expected to last only for a short period of time, or pain after surgery, nor are they recommended for opioid addiction.

Potency
With respect to equianalgesic dosing, when used sublingually, the potency of buprenorphine is about 40 to 70 times that of morphine. When used as a transdermal patch, the potency of buprenorphine may be 100 to 115 times that of morphine.

Veterinary uses

Veterinarians frequently administer buprenorphine for perioperative pain, particularly in cats, where its effects are similar to morphine. The drug's legal status and lower potential for human abuse makes it an attractive alternative to other opioids.

Adverse effects

Common adverse drug reactions associated with the use of buprenorphine, similar to those of other opioids, include nausea and vomiting, drowsiness, dizziness, headache, memory loss, cognitive and neural inhibition, perspiration, itchiness, dry mouth, shrinking of the pupils of the eyes (miosis), orthostatic hypotension, male ejaculatory difficulty, decreased libido, and urinary retention. Constipation and central nervous system (CNS) effects are seen less frequently than with morphine.

Respiratory effects

The most severe side effect associated with buprenorphine is respiratory depression (insufficient breathing). It occurs more often in those who are also taking benzodiazepines or alcohol, or have underlying lung disease. The usual reversal agents for opioids, such as naloxone, may be only partially effective, and additional efforts to support breathing may be required. Respiratory depression may be less than with other opioids, particularly with chronic use. In the setting of acute pain management, though, buprenorphine appears to cause the same rate of respiratory depression as other opioids such as morphine.

Buprenorphine dependence
Buprenorphine treatment carries the risk of causing psychological or physiological (physical) dependencies. It has a slow onset of activity, with a long duration of action, and a long half-life of 24 to 60 hours. Once a patient has stabilised on the (buprenorphine) medication and programme, three options remain - continual use (buprenorphine-only medication), switching to a buprenorphine/naloxone combination, or a medically supervised withdrawal.

Pain management

Achieving acute opioid analgesia is difficult in persons using buprenorphine for pain management.

Pharmacology

Pharmacodynamics

Opioid receptor modulator
Buprenorphine has been reported to possess these following pharmacological activities:

 μ-Opioid receptor (MOR): Very high affinity partial agonist: at low doses, the MOR-mediated effects of buprenorphine are comparable to those of other narcotics, but these effects reach a "ceiling" as the receptor population is saturated. This behavior is responsible for several unique properties: buprenorphine greatly reduces the effect of most other MOR agonists, can cause precipitated withdrawal when used in actively opioid dependent persons, and has a lower incidence of respiratory depression and fatal overdose relative to full MOR agonists.
 κ-Opioid receptor (KOR): High affinity antagonist—this activity is hypothesized to underlie some of the effects of buprenorphine on mood disorders and addiction.
 δ-Opioid receptor (DOR): High affinity antagonist
 Nociceptin receptor (NOP, ORL-1): Weak affinity, very weak partial agonist

In simplified terms, buprenorphine can essentially be thought of as a nonselective, mixed agonist–antagonist opioid receptor modulator, acting as an unusually high affinity, weak partial agonist of the MOR, a high affinity antagonist of the KOR and DOR, and a relatively low affinity, very weak partial agonist of the ORL-1/NOP.

Although buprenorphine is a partial agonist of the MOR, human studies have found that it acts like a full agonist with respect to analgesia in opioid-intolerant individuals. Conversely, buprenorphine behaves like a partial agonist of the MOR with respect to respiratory depression.

Buprenorphine is also known to bind to with high affinity and antagonize the putative ε-opioid receptor.

Full analgesic efficacy of buprenorphine requires both exon 11- and exon 1-associated μ-opioid receptor splice variants.

The active metabolites of buprenorphine are not thought to be clinically important in its CNS effects.

In positron emission tomography (PET) imaging studies, buprenorphine was found to decrease whole-brain MOR availability due to receptor occupancy by 41% (i.e., 59% availability) at 2 mg, 80% (i.e., 20% availability) at 16 mg, and 84% (i.e., 16% availability) at 32 mg.

Other actions
Unlike some other opioids and opioid antagonists, buprenorphine binds only weakly to and possesses little if any activity at the sigma receptor.

Buprenorphine also blocks voltage-gated sodium channels via the local anesthetic binding site, and this underlies its potent local anesthetic properties.

Similarly to various other opioids, buprenorphine has also been found to act as an agonist of the toll-like receptor 4, albeit with very low affinity.

Pharmacokinetics
Buprenorphine is metabolized by the liver, via CYP3A4 (also CYP2C8 seems to be involved) isozymes of the cytochrome P450 enzyme system, into norbuprenorphine (by N-dealkylation). The glucuronidation of buprenorphine is primarily carried out by UGT1A1 and UGT2B7, and that of norbuprenorphine by UGT1A1 and UGT1A3. These glucuronides are then eliminated mainly through excretion into bile. The elimination half-life of buprenorphine is 20 to 73 hours (mean 37 hours). Due to the mainly hepatic elimination,  no risk of accumulation exists in people with renal impairment.

One of the major active metabolites of buprenorphine is norbuprenorphine, which, in contrast to buprenorphine itself, is a full agonist of the MOR, DOR, and ORL-1, and a partial agonist at the KOR. However, relative to buprenorphine, norbuprenorphine has extremely little antinociceptive potency (1/50th that of buprenorphine), but markedly depresses respiration (10-fold more than buprenorphine). This may be explained by very poor brain penetration of norbuprenorphine due to a high affinity of the compound for P-glycoprotein. In contrast to norbuprenorphine, buprenorphine and its glucuronide metabolites are negligibly transported by P-glycoprotein.

The glucuronides of buprenorphine and norbuprenorphine are also biologically active, and represent major active metabolites of buprenorphine. Buprenorphine-3-glucuronide has affinity for the MOR (Ki = 4.9 pM), DOR (Ki = 270 nM) and ORL-1 (Ki = 36 μM), and no affinity for the KOR. It has a small antinociceptive effect and no effect on respiration. Norbuprenorphine-3-glucuronide has no affinity for the MOR or DOR, but does bind to the KOR (Ki = 300 nM) and ORL-1 (Ki = 18 μM). It has a sedative effect but no effect on respiration.

Chemistry
Buprenorphine is a semisynthetic derivative of thebaine, and is fairly soluble in water, as its hydrochloride salt. It degrades in the presence of light.

Detection in body fluids
Buprenorphine and norbuprenorphine may be quantified in blood or urine to monitor use or non-medical recreational use, confirm a diagnosis of poisoning, or assist in a medicolegal investigation. A significant overlap of drug concentrations exists in body fluids within the possible spectrum of physiological reactions ranging from asymptomatic to comatose. Therefore, having knowledge of both the route of administration of the drug and the level of tolerance to opioids of the individual is critical when results are interpreted.

History
In 1969, researchers at Reckitt and Colman (now Reckitt Benckiser) had spent 10 years attempting to synthesize an opioid compound "with structures substantially more complex than morphine [that] could retain the desirable actions whilst shedding the undesirable side effects". Physical dependence and withdrawal from buprenorphine itself remain important issues, since buprenorphine is a long-acting opioid. Reckitt found success when researchers synthesized RX6029 which had showed success in reducing dependence in test animals. RX6029 was named buprenorphine and began trials on humans in 1971. By 1978, buprenorphine was first launched in the UK as an injection to treat severe pain, with a sublingual formulation released in 1982.

Society and culture

Regulation

United States
In the United States, buprenorphine and buprenorphine with naloxone were approved for opioid use disorder by the Food and Drug Administration in October 2002. The DEA rescheduled buprenorphine from a schedule V drug to a schedule III drug just before approval. The ACSCN for buprenorphine is 9064, and being a schedule III substance, it does not have an annual manufacturing quota imposed by the DEA. The salt in use is the hydrochloride, which has a free-base conversion ratio of 0.928.

In the years before buprenorphine/naloxone was approved, Reckitt Benckiser had lobbied Congress to help craft the Drug Addiction Treatment Act of 2000, which gave authority to the Secretary of Health and Human Services to grant a waiver to physicians with certain training to prescribe and administer schedule III, IV, or V narcotic drugs for the treatment of addiction or detoxification. Before this law was passed, such treatment was permitted only in clinics designed specifically for drug addiction.

The waiver, which can be granted after the completion of an eight-hour course, was required for outpatient treatment of opioid addiction with buprenorphine from 2000 to 2021. Initially, the number of people each approved physician could treat was limited to 10. This was eventually modified to allow approved physicians to treat up to 100 people with buprenorphine for opioid addiction in an outpatient setting. This limit was increased by the Obama administration, raising the number of patients to which doctors can prescribe to 275. On 14 January 2021, the US Department of Health and Human Services announced that the waiver would no longer be required to prescribe buprenorphine to treat up to 30 people concurrently.

New Jersey authorized paramedics to give buprenorphine to people at the scene after they have recovered from an overdose.

Europe
In the European Union, Subutex and Suboxone, buprenorphine's high-dose sublingual tablet preparations, were approved for opioid use disorder treatment in September 2006. In the Netherlands, buprenorphine is a list II drug of the Opium Law, though special rules and guidelines apply to its prescription and dispensation. In France, where buprenorphine prescription by general practitioners and dispensed by pharmacies has been permitted since the mid-1990s as a response to HIV and overdose risk. Deaths caused by heroin overdose were reduced by four-fifths between 1994 and 2002, and  incidence of AIDS among people who inject drugs in France fell from 25% in the mid-1990s to 6% in 2010.

Brand names
Buprenorphine is available under the trade names Cizdol, Brixadi (weekly and monthly depot injections approved in the US by FDA for addiction treatment in 2020), Suboxone (with naloxone), Subutex (typically used for opioid use disorder), Zubsolv, Bunavail,  Buvidal (weekly and monthly depot injections, approved in the UK, Europe and Australia for addiction treatment in 2018), Sublocade (monthly injection, approved in the US in 2018), Probuphine, Temgesic (sublingual tablets for moderate to severe pain), Buprenex (solutions for injection often used for acute pain in primary-care settings), Norspan, and Butrans (transdermal preparations used for chronic pain). In Poland buprenorphine is available under the trade names Bunondol (for pain treatment, when morphine is too little; amounts of 0.2mg and 0.4mg) and Bunorfin (for addicts substitution in amount of 2 and 8mg).

Buprenorphine has been introduced in most European countries as a transdermal formulation (marketed as Transtec) for the treatment of chronic pain not responding to nonopioids.

Veterinary medicine
It has veterinary medical use for treatment of pain in dogs and cats.

Research

Depression
Some evidence supports the use of buprenorphine for depression. Buprenorphine/samidorphan, a combination product of buprenorphine and samidorphan (a preferential μ-opioid receptor antagonist), appears useful for treatment-resistant depression.

Cocaine dependence
In combination with samidorphan or naltrexone (μ-opioid receptor antagonists), buprenorphine is under investigation for the treatment of cocaine dependence, and recently demonstrated effectiveness for this indication in a large-scale (n = 302) clinical trial (at a high buprenorphine dose of 16 mg, but not a low dose of 4 mg).

Neonatal abstinence
Buprenorphine has been used in the treatment of the neonatal abstinence syndrome, a condition in which newborns exposed to opioids during pregnancy demonstrate signs of withdrawal. In the United States, use currently is limited to infants enrolled in a clinical trial conducted under an FDA-approved investigational new drug (IND) application. Preliminary research suggests that buprenorphine is associated with shorter time in hospital for neonates, compared to methadone. An ethanolic formulation used in neonates is stable at room temperature for at least 30 days.

Obsessive–compulsive disorder
In one study, buprenorphine was found to be effective in a subset of individuals with treatment-refractory obsessive–compulsive disorder.

References

External links 
 
 U.S. Federal government buprenorphine program for opioid addiction
 Australian national buprenorphine policy
 "The bitter pill": A Wired article on Suboxone
 "Subu Must Die – How a nation of junkies went cold turkey": A New Republic article on Subutex abuse in the nation of Georgia

Cat medications
CYP2D6 inhibitors
CYP3A4 inhibitors
Delta-opioid receptor antagonists
Dog medications
Drug rehabilitation
4,5-Epoxymorphinans
Ethers
Euphoriants
Kappa-opioid receptor antagonists
Merck & Co. brands
Mu-opioid receptor agonists
Nociceptin receptor agonists
Nociceptin receptor antagonists
Oripavines
Phenols
Schering-Plough brands
Semisynthetic opioids
Sodium channel blockers
Tertiary alcohols
Wikipedia medicine articles ready to translate